Ronald Allan Josol (born August 2, 1974) is a Filipino Canadian actor and stand-up comedian. He has been featured on the show Video on Trial, which he has also written for.

References

External links
 
 

1974 births
Living people
Canadian stand-up comedians
Canadian male actors of Filipino descent
21st-century Canadian male actors
21st-century Canadian comedians